Chaetapatrobus is a genus of ground beetles in the family Carabidae. This genus has a single species, Chaetapatrobus valentinae. It is found in Russia.

References

Carabidae